This is a list of Chinese sociologists and anthropologists. The academic disciplines of sociology and anthropology were under active development in China in the 20th century.

Chinese sociologists and anthropologists

See also
 Chinese Academy of Social Sciences
 Chinese Social Sciences Citation Index
 List of anthropologists

References